Linfield may refer to:

 Linfield F.C., a semi-professional football club in Northern Ireland
 Linfield Rangers, the youth team of Linfield F.C. 
 Linfield College, an institution of education in Oregon, United States
 Linfield Review, a newspaper published by students at Linfield College
 Linfield, Pennsylvania, a village in Pennsylvania, United States

People 
 Frances Linfield (1852–1940), American educator, social activist and philanthropist 
 Frederick Linfield (1861–1939), British politician 
 George Fisher Linfield (1846–1890), American clergyman and educator
 Mark Linfield, producer of nature documentaries on British TV

See also
 Lindfield (disambiguation)
 Lingfield (disambiguation)

Disambiguation pages with surname-holder lists
English-language surnames